Eleothreptus is a genus of nightjars in the family Caprimulgidae.
It contains the following species:

 Sickle-winged nightjar (Eleothreptus anomalus)
 White-winged nightjar (Eleothreptus candicans)

References

 
Nightjars
Taxa named by George Robert Gray
Taxonomy articles created by Polbot

br:Eleothreptus
pt:Eleothreptus